Palisades was a New York City live music venue located at 906 Broadway in Bushwick, Brooklyn.

Founding 
Palisades was founded by Leeor Waisbrod, with Rose Fathers, and Ariel Bitran.

Operations 
The venue began hosting art shows in April 2014 and started hosting concerts shortly thereafter. Palisades presented hundreds of concerts between 2014 and 2016, including performances from bands such as Parquet Courts, Skepta, Xiu Xiu, Guerilla Toss, and Hinds. In its final year, Palisades presented performances by bands such as Bodega Bay and Useless Eaters.

Closure 
In June 2016, Palisades was shut down during Northside Festival. An article in Gothamist explained that the venue had been shut down due to multiple building code violations.  Management initially stated that the venue would only be closed "for a few days," but in August 2016 it was announced that Palisades would remain permanently closed. Several previously booked concerts were rescheduled at other Brooklyn venues such as Shea Stadium.

In popular culture 
Following the increased popularity of the venue, Palisades was featured on the cover of the New Yorker in April 2016.

Gallery

See also 

 Culture of Brooklyn
 Music of New York City

References

External links 
 Official website (archived)

2014 establishments in New York City
2016 disestablishments in New York (state)
Entertainment venues in Brooklyn
Former music venues in New York City
Bushwick, Brooklyn
Music venues in Brooklyn